This is a progressive list of men's association footballers who have held or co-held the European record for international goals since 1873. The progression up to 1956 is derivable from the world record progression because the world record holder was always European.

Cristiano Ronaldo became the first European and the second world international player to score 100 international goals. He scored his 100th goal for Portugal on 8 September 2020 against Sweden.

Criteria
The criteria used by national FAs in considering a match as a full international were not historically fixed. Particularly for the early decades, and until more recently for FAs outside UEFA and CONMEBOL, counts of goals were often considered unreliable. RSSSF and IFFHS have spent much effort trying to produce definitive lists of full international matches, and corresponding data on players' international caps and goals. Using this data, the following records can be retrospectively produced. Note that, at the time, these records may not have been recognised.

One point of note is that early matches by the England Amateur side were played against the full national side of opponents. These matches are counted as full internationals by the IFFHS and the opposing FAs, though not by the (English) FA. This affects Vivian Woodward, who scored 29 full goals and 44 amateur goals; the IFFHS and RSSSF considers him as the record-holder from 1908.

European record

See also
 Progression of association football goalscoring record (world record)
 List of men's footballers with 50 or more international goals

References

Association football record progressions